This is the filmography of Indian actor R. S. Manohar, who performed roles ranging from hero to villain to comedic character. He acted over 300 Tamil film. He was popular for negative roles. He also played supporting roles in films with actors M. G. Ramachandran, Sivaji Ganesan, Gemini Ganesan, S. S. Rajendran, Jaishankar, Ravichandran, Sivakumar, Rajinikanth and Kamal Haasan. He is known for his versatility and dominating personality.

According to film historian Randor Guy he got a break through in film with Rajambal (1951), well known crime novel of J. R. Rangaraju and produced by Modern Theatres, it was his debut film, Madhuri Devi was heroine and he was paid 25,000 remuneration. The film fared well at the box office. His early memorable roles were in films such as Viduthalai (1954), where he played victimised brother of a vicious lawyer - judge. A top class K. Ramnoth movie. The film based on play The First and the Last. Vannakili (1959), where he played drunkard thug named as Poochie, he forcefully marries village girl Saraswarthi and gives her a hard time. Vannakili proved a great success. In Kaithi Kannayiram (1960), he played an innocent banker who loses his son and is jailed on false charges. He finds a new direction in life and decides to save the life of the Jailor's son who is kidnapped by other inmates of the jail. The film was a commercial hit at the box office. Konjum Salangai(1962), where he played a dictatorial commander who wants to usurp the throne. In Vallavanukku Vallavan (1965), he played an honest police inspector who goes undercover as thug named Pichuva Pakkiri. The film ran for over 100 days in theatres. Vallavan Oruvan(1966), where he played Dr. Sargunam, a Tamil hypnotist and psychologist with the help of his finance. A doctor who promotes drug abuse, murder and anti-social activities. He is a cape wearing supervillain and mad scientist in Iru Vallavargal (1966).

Manohar was T. R. Sundaram favorite, starring in 18 film of his films. The highest by any actor working for Modern Theatres such as Rajambal, Petra Maganai Vitra Annai, Vannakili, Thalai Koduthaan Thambi, Kaithi Kannayiram, Konjum Kumari, Kattu Roja, Chitrangi, Vallavanukku Vallavan, Vallavan Oruvan, Iru Vallavargal, Ethirigal Jakkirathai, Kadhalithal Podhuma, Naangu Killadigal, CID Shankar, Justice Viswanathan, Karundhel Kannayiram, Thedi Vandha Lakshmi.

Filmography

1950s

1960s

1970s

1980s

1990s

References

External links
 
 Icon of Tamil theatre

Indian filmographies
Male actor filmographies